Chris Roberts (born May 27, 1968) is a British-American video game designer, programmer, film producer and film director. He created the Wing Commander series while at Origin Systems and as of 2011 has been working on the crowdfunded space simulator Star Citizen.

Early life 
Roberts was born in Redwood City, California to a British father and an American mother, and grew up in Manchester, England. He attended Parrs Wood High School, the same school as computer music composer Martin Galway. As a teenager, he created several video games for the BBC Micro, including Stryker's Run, Wizadore, and King Kong.

Career

Origin Systems 
Roberts returned to the United States in 1986 to visit his parents, who had settled in Austin, Texas. He found a job at Origin Systems, where he created Times of Lore, published in 1988. The game's interface had a strong influence on other Origin products such as the popular Ultima series. A similar game system was used in Roberts's next release for Origin, Bad Blood (1990).

Wing Commander was published later in 1990 and was highly acclaimed. Wing Commander (and the franchise it spawned) soon became Origin's most successful product. Roberts wasn't as heavily involved in the sequel Wing Commander II, which he only produced. He instead concentrated on Strike Commander. First shown to the public at Summer CES 1991, the project suffered from numerous delays and was not released until 1993. He returned to Wing Commander soon after, devising the original concept for the spin-off Wing Commander: Privateer (which his brother, Erin Roberts, produced) and being more deeply involved in Wing Commander III and Wing Commander IV. For these sequels, Roberts directed the live-action cinematic scenes. Roberts's major role in developing the Wing Commander games led Next Generation to name him one of their "75 Most Important People in the Games Industry of 1995".

Following the traditions of Origin Systems, Chris Roberts's residence at the outskirts of Austin, Texas was named "Commander's Ranch", a reference to the Wing Commander series.

Digital Anvil 
Roberts left Origin in 1996 and founded Digital Anvil with Tony Zurovec and his brother Erin Roberts. He cited disillusionment with working with large development teams and Origin parent company Electronic Arts' unwillingness to give substantial funding to games that weren't sequels. The fledgling studio set up shop in Austin and for several years worked quietly, inking a publishing deal with Microsoft in 1997.

Roberts had stated that he desired to produce films as well as games with Digital Anvil. The 1999 feature film release of Wing Commander directed by Roberts himself, starring Freddie Prinze Jr. and featuring visual effects from Digital Anvil failed to attract either critical praise or financial success.

Digital Anvil's first finished game was Starlancer, released to a generally favorable critical reception in 2000. Developed jointly between Warthog and Digital Anvil, the game was produced by the Roberts brothers, and Eric Peterson. The company was acquired by Microsoft soon after, who sold two of Digital Anvil's projects, Conquest: Frontier Wars led by Eric Peterson, and Loose Cannon led by Tony Zurovec to Ubisoft. Roberts left the company after the acquisition, abandoning the director position of his ambitious project Freelancer, although he remained with the game in a consulting role for a while. The game was commonly regarded as vaporware due to its promised release date of 2001 however it was eventually released in 2003 with a markedly different feature set than the initial plans.

Point of No Return Entertainment/Ascendant Pictures 
After leaving Digital Anvil, Roberts founded Point of No Return Entertainment, planning to produce films, television and games. However, no projects materialized from Point of No Return. Roberts founded Ascendant Pictures in 2002 and served as a producer for a number of Hollywood productions including Edison, Timber Falls, Outlander, Who's Your Caddy?, The Big White, Ask the Dust, Lucky Number Slevin and Lord of War, which were almost entirely financed by a loophole in the German tax laws that was finally closed in 2006. Robert's activities as a film producer ended with the depletion of the funds raised by this controversial financing scheme. In 2005, actor Kevin Costner sued Ascendant Pictures for breach of contract on an unreleased film. The company was acquired by Bigfoot Entertainment in 2010.

Cloud Imperium Games 

In 2011, Chris Roberts founded Cloud Imperium Games with his wife Sandi Roberts, as well as business partner and long-time international media attorney Ortwin Freyermuth, to work on a new game. In October 2012, Cloud Imperium Games launched a crowdfunding campaign on their website to produce a space simulation game, Star Citizen, and later added a Kickstarter campaign in conjunction. By November 2012, they had earned US$6,238,563, surpassing all stretch goals set for the campaigns, and breaking video game industry crowdfunding records. Chris Roberts had stated that if at least $23 million could be raised over the course of the crowdfunding campaign, no outside investors' or developers' funding would be required. This goal was reached October 18, 2013.

As of February 22, 2022, Cloud Imperium Games has raised over US$474 million in crowdfunding and over $63.25 million in external investments. Cloud Imperium Games' other title in development, Squadron 42, a single-player campaign set in the Star Citizen universe, is still in development and has no confirmed release date as of March 2022, although Cloud Imperium Games has announced they are allocating more resources toward its development.

Works 
Video games

Films

References

External links 

1968 births
American computer programmers
Film producers from California
American video game designers
Film directors from California
Living people
Origin Systems people
Mass media people from Manchester
People from Redwood City, California
American video game directors
American video game programmers
Video game writers
Wing Commander (franchise)
People educated at Parrs Wood High School